Secrettame (March 15, 1978 – March 17, 2006) was a Thoroughbred racehorse and broodmare.

She was originally purchased as a yearling at the Keeneland Yearling Sales by Venezuelan owner Jose "Pepe" Sahagun and his Villa Blanca Farms. It was Sahagun's vision, even as a yearling, that she would one day be bred to Mr. Prospector. It was that vision that produced the very good stallion Gone West.

Secrettame was a daughter of the great Triple Crown winner Secretariat. Her dam, Tamerett, was sired by Hall of Famer Tim Tam who won the 1958 Kentucky Derby and the Preakness Stakes but whose strong bid for the Triple Crown and his racing career both ended when he fractured a sesamoid bone in his right foreleg a quarter of a mile from the finish and struggled the last yards in second place.

She was the dam of racehorse and sire Gone West, whose son, Elusive Quality, sired 2004 American Champion Three-Year-Old Colt Smarty Jones. Smarty Jones was the first undefeated horse to win the Kentucky Derby since Seattle Slew in 1977, but lost the final leg of the Triple Crown, the Belmont Stakes, to Birdstone. She was also the dam of Lion Cavern.

In March 2006, at age 28 Secrettame died of a severe bout of colic.

Pedigree

References 

1978 racehorse births
2006 racehorse deaths
Racehorses trained in the United States
Racehorses bred in Kentucky
Thoroughbred family 2-f